is a dam in Kitagawa, Kōchi Prefecture, Japan, completed in 1963. It is located on the Nahari River immediately downstream from the Yanase Dam and further upstream from the Hiranabe Dam.

References 

Dams in Kōchi Prefecture
Dams completed in 1963